The Message is the debut studio album of American hip hop group Grandmaster Flash and the Furious Five, released on October 3, 1982 by Sugar Hill Records. It features the influential title track and hip-hop single "The Message".

Release and reception 

The Message was released in October 1982 by Sugar Hill Records. The album charted at number 53 in the United States and at number 77 in the United Kingdom.

Reviewing in December 1982 for The New York Times, Robert Palmer hailed The Message as the year's best album and explained that while the emerging rap genre had often been criticized for confining itself to "bragging and boasting ... The Message is different. It's a gritty, plain-spoken, vividly cinematic portrait of black street life...social realism has rarely worked well in a pop-music context, but The Message is an utterly convincing cry of frustration and despair that cannot be ignored." Robert Christgau ranked it as the 21st best album of 1982 his list for The Village Voices annual Pazz & Jop critics' poll. In Christgau's Record Guide: The '80s (1990), he wrote that, although "She's Fresh" is the "only instant killer", each song's attempt to experiment and "touch a lot of bases with a broad demographic ... justifies itself".

According to music journalist Tom Breihan, The Message was a "singles-plus filler cash-in" that proved "a fascinating time capsule of rap's early attempts with the album format" as well as "a full-length artistic breakthrough, a rap album that earned respect on its own terms". In a retrospective review, AllMusic's Ron Wynn called it the "ultimate peak" for Grandmaster Flash and the Furious Five, naming the title track as its highlight. Miles Marshall Lewis, reviewing the album's 2002 British reissue in The New Rolling Stone Album Guide (2004), cited "The Adventures of Grandmaster Flash on the Wheels of Steel" as the "clincher" and "the only prime-period example of Flash's ability to set and shatter moods, with his turntables and faders running through a collage of at least 10 records that sound like hundreds." Mark Richardson from Pitchfork said that The Message featured "two absolutely essential songs"—the title track and "Scorpio," which he dubbed "the greatest early electro track." However, he felt the rest of the songs were inferior. The album was also included in the book 1001 Albums You Must Hear Before You Die.

Track listing

Sample credits
 "She's Fresh" contains samples from "It's Just Begun" by The Jimmy Castor Bunch and "The Lovomaniacs" by Boobie Knight.
 "It's Nasty" contains samples from "Genius of Love" by Tom Tom Club.
 "It's a Shame" contains samples from "Mt. Airy Groove" by Pieces Of A Dream.
 "The Adventures of Grandmaster Flash on the Wheels of Steel" contains samples from "Good Times" by Chic, "Apache" by The Incredible Bongo Band, "Rapture" by Blondie, "Another One Bites the Dust" by Queen, "8th Wonder" by The Sugarhill Gang, "Monster Jam" by Sequence, "Glow of Love" by Change and "Life Story" by The Hellers.

Personnel 
Grandmaster Flash (Joseph Saddler) – turntables, drum programming, Flashformer transform DJ device, background vocals
Keef Cowboy (Keith Wiggins) – lead and background vocals, writer and arranger
Grandmaster Melle Mel (Melvin Glover) – lead and background vocals, writer and arranger
The Kidd Creole (Nathaniel Glover Jr.) – lead and background vocals, writer and arranger
Scorpio (Eddie Morris) – lead and background vocals, writer and arranger
Rahiem (Guy Todd Williams) – lead and background vocals, writer and arranger
Doug Wimbish - bass
Skip McDonald - guitar
Reggie Griffin, Jiggs, Sylvia Robinson - Prophet Sequential
Gary Henry, Dwain Mitchell - keyboards
Keith Leblanc - drums
Ed Fletcher - percussion
Chops Horn Section - brass

Charts

Album

Singles

References

Bibliography

External links

Groups Official Website
The Kidd Creole's Official Website
The Message (Adobe Flash) at Radio3Net (streamed copy where licensed)
 

1982 debut albums
Grandmaster Flash and the Furious Five albums
Electro albums by American artists
Albums produced by Grandmaster Flash
Sugar Hill Records (hip hop label) albums